

The Capture of Ceylon Medal is a campaign medal that was awarded by the Governor-General of India to soldiers in Bengal artillery units of the armies of the East India Company (EIC) who took part in the capture of Ceylon in 1795–96.

Criteria
The medal was instituted on 15 May 1807 by an Order in Council at Fort William, India. It was awarded to surviving members of the Bengal Army artillery who served under the command of the East India Company during the British invasion of Dutch Ceylon, over the period 21 July 1795 – 16 February 1796, during the French Revolutionary Wars. The medals were finally completed and distributed in 1811.

Two medals were cast in gold for award to officers, probably Captains Barton and Clarke but possibly to two native officers, with 121 being cast in silver for native Indian non-commissioned officers and men (known as Gun Lascars) of the Bengal Artillery. 

Other participants of the invasion, including other East India Company troops and British Crown forces, did not receive a medal.

Description
The medal was struck at the Calcutta Mint in gold and in silver. They were of a plain design, with both sides of the medal having only an inscription: 
The obverse has the English wording: For Services on the Island of Ceylon A.D. 1795/6.The reverse has a Persian inscription that translates as: This medal was given by way of acknowledgment of services in Ceylon in the year of the Hijrah 1209-1210.The medal was issued unnamed.The original suspension was a flattened loop, riveted at the base, and was intended to be worn round the neck with a yellow cord; the EIC would not award medals with ribbons proper until 1826 with the award of the Burma Medal.

See also
Invasion of Ceylon (1795)
Ceylon Medal
Military awards and decorations of Sri Lanka

References

External links
British Army Medals: Capture of Ceylon Medal
Fitzwilliam Museum: Capture of Ceylon Medal

Awards established in 1807
Military awards and decorations of the United Kingdom
British campaign medals
Medals of the Honourable East India Company
British military medals of the Napoleonic Wars
Dutch Ceylon